The Ambacang was a hotel located in Padang, West Sumatra, Indonesia that was destroyed,  with significant loss of life, by the major earthquake that struck West Sumatra.
In the Dutch colonial era, the building was used by the Central Trading Company and the Handelsvereeniging Harmsen Verwey & Dunlop N.V. When it became a hotel, it retained the architectural style and atmosphere of the Dutch colonial period.

Following its destruction in 2009, the ruins were demolished and a new hotel was built on the  old site.

References

Padang
Hotels in Indonesia
Demolished hotels
Defunct hotels in Indonesia
Buildings and structures in West Sumatra
Demolished buildings and structures in Indonesia